Nat Polen (June 14, 1914 — May 3, 1981) was an American actor. He is known for his long-running character roles playing physicians on ABC and CBS soap operas.

Polen played Dr. Doug Cassen on As the World Turns for over 9 years, from April 1957 until October 1966. He then played Ephraim Webster on The Edge of Night and Dr. John Crager on the ABC afternoon version of The Nurses.  He later became second acor to portray Dr. Jim Craig on One Life to Live from 1969 until shortly before his death from pancreatic cancer in 1981. He was also a film actor, playing Lt. Reilly in the 1972 film Across 110th Street. Other credits include appearing in 37 episodes of CBS Radio Mystery Theatre.

Filmography

References

External links

Male actors from New York City
20th-century American male actors
1914 births
1981 deaths
Deaths from pancreatic cancer
Deaths from cancer in New York (state)